Thomas or Tom Morrissey may refer to:
 Thomas Morrissey (Jesuit), Irish historian, teacher and writer
 Thomas Morrissey (athlete) (1888–1968), American long-distance runner
 Tom Morrissey (politician) (born 1956), Irish politician and businessman
 Tom Morrissey (baseball) (1860–1941), American Major League Baseball player
 Tom Morrissey (hurler) (born 1996), Irish hurler
 Tom Morrissey (Gaelic footballer)